Aleksandr Igorevich Kovalenko (born 8 August 2003) is a Russian football player who plays for PFC Krylia Sovetov Samara on loan from PFC Sochi and the Russia national team.

Club career
After beginning his career with FC Chertanovo Moscow, on 5 February 2022 Kovalenko joined Russian Premier League club PFC Krylia Sovetov Samara. He made his RPL debut for Krylia Sovetov on 6 March 2022 in a game against FC Arsenal Tula.

On 25 July 2022, Kovalenko signed with PFC Sochi and was loaned back to Krylia Sovetov.

International career
Kovalenko was called up to the Russia national football team for the first time for a friendly against Kyrgyzstan in September 2022. He made his debut in that game on 24 September 2022.

Personal life
Born to a Ukrainian-Armenian father and an Armenian mother.

His grandfather, also called Aleksandr Kovalenko, won the Soviet Top League once and Soviet Cup twice with FC Ararat Yerevan.

Career statistics

References

External links
 
 
 
 

2003 births
Russian people of Ukrainian descent
Russian people of Armenian descent
Living people
Russian footballers
Russia youth international footballers
Russia international footballers
Association football midfielders
FC Chertanovo Moscow players
PFC Krylia Sovetov Samara players
PFC Sochi players
Russian Second League players
Russian Premier League players
Russia under-21 international footballers